Extranghero is a superhero comedy film co-written and directed by Ben Feleo and starring Andrew E., Michelle Aldana, and Jorge Estregan. Produced by Viva Films, it was released on December 12, 1997.

Plot
Botong (Andrew E.) with his father (Joji Isla) leaves his home province to find a decent livelihood in Manila.

Botong then unknowingly tags along with a group of robbers who offered him a "job". The group breaks into a house and attempts to molest a sleeping woman. Botong recognizes the woman whose name is Kristy (Michelle Aldana) and realize the ill intent of the robbers and stops them. The robbers are arrested by the police. Kristy convinces her mother, Doña Isabel (Zeny Zabala), to let Botong stay in their house. Botong then works at their house as a househelp.

Botong helps Kristy prepare for a party and the two started to develop feelings for each other. The two dance in the party. Kristy's fiancé, Ivan (Jorge Estregan) arrives late and saw the two dance together. Irritated and called Botong an "insect" kicks him out of the party.

Kristy's mother notices her daughter's feelings for Botong and pleads Kristy to not commit the same mistake as she did. Ivan shortly proposed to Kristy to marry him. Kristy rejects Ivan and Botong who was nearby sided with her. This ensues a fight which leads to Kristy's mother and Kristy herself to kick him to leave for his own good. Ivan also leaves heartbroken.

Two meteors from space then strikes Earth. One hit Ivan who was part of a convoy, but alone driving a car and another hit Botong. Botong went to space due to the collision while Ivan remained earthbound trapped in his car which is burning.

Botong then talks to a celestial entity in space which says he will give him a "better role" beyond "being a protagonist". Botong was then sent back to Earth and finds out that he gained superpowers. He helped stop thugs fleeing by car and the reporter who witnessed the crime dubbed him as "Extranghero" for being an "extra" in the incident.

Another reporter came to cover the meteor which hit Ivan who is seemingly dead. Ivan removes himself from the burning debris to the excitement of the reporter who believes he has just witness a miracle. The reporter then attempts to interview Ivan who burns him to death. His bodyguards and secretary Espertina witness his deed who pledges their loyalty to Ivan.

Botong and his dad later ends up in jail who meets the robbers Botong encountered earlier. Botong and his father escape with the former's newfound powers. The two applied for a job as a messenger and maintenance employee. Botong uses his powers to help them get hired. Botong then explored his powers helping others while not in costume.

Ivan on his part uses his powers for evil and along with his employees who now serves as his henchmen commit to a life of crime. Ivan who is in a costume introduces himself as a supervillain to the media.

Ivan later ordered his minions to kidnap Kristy. Kristy then successfully flees but got stuck in a PNR railroad. A train is about to hit her but Extranghero saves her life.

Ivan later kidnaps Kristy himself and keeps her in a chemical storage facility in the Port Area of Manila. Ivan then promises to Kristy that she will become his queen and have a family and they will rule the world. Kristy rejects Ivan again and Espertina objects saying Ivan promised the same to her. He reminded her that she pledged to follow his every wish. Ivan then kissed Kristy against her wishes.

Extranghero arrives and fights with Ivan. Ivan entrusts Kristy to Espertina and the two women fight as well. Kristy manages to escape Espertina's custody which leads to Ivan giving Espertina some superhuman abilities. Espertina then overpowers Kristy and pushes her from a platform which kills her.

Extranghero is devastated and blames fate while holding Kristy in his arms saying he is just starting to know her. Electricity appears in his hands which the hero uses to revive Kristy. This also gives her temporary powers so she can continue her fight with Espertina.

The hero continued his fight with Ivan and throws a large flammable container to Ivan seemingly killing him. The resulting explosion starts a chemical reaction as a reporter with Kristy's mother and other civilians arrives near the site.

Extranghero flies with Kristy out of the facility an leaves Kristy with her mother. Botong arrives feigning jealousy to his superpowered alter ego. Kristy confess and they attempt to kiss but they were stopped by her mother. Botong's father arrives and told his son that their boss is looking for them. Dona Isabel recognizes Botong's father as her husband meaning that Botong and Kristy are siblings. However Isabel disclosed that she adopted Kristy due to her separation with her long lost son meaning that the two could indeed be together.

Then Ivan appears, still alive, to the shock of all people who were present.

Cast
Andrew E. as Extranghero/Botong
Michelle Aldana as Kristy
Jorge Estregan as Ivan
Julie Lorette as Espertina
Zeny Zabala as Doña Isabel
Joji Isla as Cadio
Blakdyak

Music
Filipino-Chinese rapper group, Chinese Mafia did the title soundtrack of Extranghero, "Kapangyarihan".

References

External links

Extranghero at the International Catalogue of Heroes

1997 films
1997 comedy films
Filipino-language films
Philippine superhero films
Viva Films films
Films directed by Ben Feleo